This is a list of teen sitcoms that are originally targeted towards teens aged 13 to 18.

Argentina
  (2000), Canal Trece
  (1997–1998), Telefe
 Champs 12 (2009–2010), América TV
 Consentidos (2009–2010), Canal Trece
 Cuando toca la campana (2011–2012), Disney Channel Latin America
 Divina, está en tu corazón (2004), Canal Trece
 Floricienta (2004–2005), Canal Trece
 Highway: Rodando la Aventura (2010), Disney Channel Latin America
 Jake & Blake (2009), Disney Channel Latin America
 Jungle Nest (2016), Disney XD Latin America
  (1994–1996), Canal Trece
  (1996), Canal Trece
 Niní (2009–2010), Telefe
 Patito Feo (2007–2008), Canal Trece
 Peter Punk (2011–2013), Disney Channel Latin America
  (2013–2014), Canal 7
 Simona (2018), Canal Trece
 Supertorpe (2011), Telefe, Disney Channel Latin America
 Violetta (2012–2015), Disney Channel Latin America

Australia
 As the Bell Rings (2007–2011), Disney Channel Australia
 The Bureau of Magical Things (2018–present), 10 Peach
 Chuck Finn (1999–2000), ABC
 Dead Gorgeous (2010), ABC1, ABC3
 Don't Blame Me (2002–2003), Nine Network, ABC3
 Driven Crazy (1998), Network Ten
 The Elephant Princess (2008–2011), Network Ten
 The Genie from Down Under (1996–1998), ABC
 Ja'mie: Private School Girl (2013), ABC1
 Jonah from Tonga (2014), ABC1
 Mal.com (2011), ABC3
 Mind Over Maddie (2013), Disney Channel Australia
 Mortified (2006–2007), Nine Network
 Mustangs FC (2017–2020), ABC Me
 Pugwall (1989–1991), Nine Network
 Round the Twist (1989–2001), Seven Network, ABC
 Scooter: Secret Agent (2005), Network Ten
 Ship to Shore (1993–1996), ABC, Nine Network
 Summer Heights High (2006–2009), ABC1
 Worst Year of My Life Again (2014), ABC3

Brazil
 Cúmplices de um Resgate (2015–2016), SBT
 Floribella (2005–2006), Rede Bandeirantes
  (2014–2016), Disney Channel Brazil
 Julie e os Fantasmas (2011–2012), Rede Bandeirantes, Nickelodeon Brazil
  (1999–2002), Globo Network

Canada

 6teen (2004–2010), Teletoon
 15/Love (2004–2006), YTV
 18 to Life (2010–2011), CBC
 About a Girl (2007–2008), E!, The N
 Alice, I Think (2006), The Comedy Network
 Baxter (2010–2011), Family
 Big Wolf on Campus (1999–2002), YTV
 Boogies Diner (1994–1995), syndication
 Braceface (2001–2004), Teletoon
 Breaker High (1997–1998), YTV
 Clone High (2002–2003), Teletoon
 Connor Undercover (2010–2011), Family
 Daft Planet (2000–2002), Teletoon
 Darcy's Wild Life (2004–2006), Family
 Debra! (2011–2012), Family
 Dog House (1990–1991), YTV
 Family Biz (2009), YTV
 Flash Forward (1995–1997), Disney Channel
 Fred's Head (2008), Télétoon
 Fries with That? (2004–2005), YTV
 Game On (2015), YTV
 Hangin' In (1981–1987), CBC
 How to Be Indie (2009–2011), YTV
 The Latest Buzz (2007–2010), Family
 Life with Boys (2011–2013), YTV
 Life With Derek (2005–2009), Family
 Majority Rules! (2009), Teletoon
 Make It Pop (2015–2016), YTV, Nickelodeon
 Monster Warriors (2006–2008), YTV
 Mr. Meaty (2006–2009), Nickelodeon Canada
 Mr. Young (2011–2013), YTV
 My Babysitter's a Vampire (2011–2013), Teletoon
 Naturally, Sadie (2005–2007), Family
 Overruled! (2009–2011), Family Channel
 Radio Active (1998–2001), YTV
 Radio Enfer (1995–2001), Canal Famille, Vrak.TV
 Really Me (2011–2013), Family
 The Sausage Factory (2001–2002), The Comedy Network
 Some Assembly Required (2014–2016), YTV
 Son of a Critch (2022–present), CBC
 The Stanley Dynamic (2015–2017), YTV
 Student Bodies (1997–1999), YTV
 Toby (1968–1969), CBC
 What's Up Warthogs! (2011–2012), Family
 Wingin' It (2010–2013), Family
 Young Drunk Punk (2015), City

China
 As the Bell Rings (2007–2011), syndication
 Nonstop (2009), Dragon TV

Chile
 Floribella (2006–2007), TVN
 Pobre Rico (2012–2013), TVN

Colombia
  (2006–2007), RCN Televisión
 Isa TK+ (2009–2010), Nickelodeon Latin America

France
 (1995–1998), TF1
  (1993–1994), M6
 Fred's Head (2008), France 2, Unis
  (2001–2002), France 2
 Hélène et les Garçons (1992–1994), TF1
 Mère et Fille (2012–2017), Disney Channel France
  (1991–1995), TF1
 Trop la Classe (2006–2010), Disney Channel France

Germany
  (2020), Amazon Prime Video
 Kurze Pause (2006–2008), Disney Channel Germany
 Türkisch für Anfänger (2006–2009), Das Erste

India
 Agadam Bagdam Tigdam (2007), Disney Channel India
 Best of Luck Nikki (2011–2016), Disney Channel India
 Break Time Masti Time (2008–2009), Disney Channel India
 Dhoom Machaao Dhoom (2007–2008), Disney Channel India
 Hostel Daze (2019–present), TVF
 Kya Mast Hai Life (2009–2010), Disney Channel India
 Palak Pe Jhalak (2015), Disney Channel India
 Sanya (2005–2006), Hungama TV
 Shake It Up (2013), Disney Channel India
 Shararat (2003–2007), StarPlus
 Sunaina (2008), Pogo TV
 Sun Yaar Chill Maar (2007–2008), Bindass
 The Suite Life of Karan & Kabir (2012–2013), Disney Channel India
 Vicky & Vetaal (2006–2007), Disney Channel India

Israel 
  (2005–2012), Nickelodeon Israel
  (2019), Nickelodeon Israel
 Hapijamot (2003–2015), Arutz HaYeladim
  (2020–present), Nickelodeon Israel

Italy
 Alex & Co. (2015–2017), Disney Channel Italy
 Casa Pierpiero (2011), Disney Channel Italy
 Chiamatemi Giò (2009), Disney Channel Italy
 Compagni di scuola (2001), Rai 2
 Fiore e Tinelli (2007–2009), Disney Channel Italy
 Fuoriclasse (2011–2015), Rai 1
 In tour (2011–2012), Disney Channel Italy
 Maggie & Bianca: Fashion Friends (2016–2017), Rai Gulp
 Quelli dell'intervallo (2005–2008), Disney Channel Italy
 Quelli dell'Intervallo Cafe (2010–2011), Disney Channel Italy
  (2018), Disney Channel Italy

Japan
 As the Bell Rings (2010–2011), Disney Channel Japan
 Blazing Transfer Students (2017), Netflix
 Minna! ESPer Dayo! (2013), TV Tokyo
 Mischievous Kiss: Love in Tokyo (2013), Fuji TV
 Mob Psycho 100 (2018), Netflix, TV Tokyo
 My Neighbor Seki (2015), MBS
 Kyō Kara Ore Wa!! (2018), NTV
 Ouran High School Host Club (2011), TBS
 Switch Girl!! (2011–2013), Fuji TV
 Tadashii Ouji no Tsukuri Kata (2008) TV Tokyo

Malaysia
 Waktu Rehat (2010–2012), Disney Channel Malaysia
 Wizards of Warna Walk (2019), Disney Channel Malaysia

Mexico
 Atrévete a soñar (2009–2010), XEW-TDT
 Cachún cachún ra ra! (1981–1987), Televisa
 Miss XV (2012), Nickelodeon Latin America
 ¿Qué le pasa a mi familia? (2021), Canal de Las Estrellas
 Skimo (2006–2007), Nickelodeon Latin America
 Soltero con hijas (2019–2020), Canal de Las Estrellas

New Zealand
 The Amazing Extraordinary Friends (2006–2010), TV2
 Being Eve (2001–2002), TV3
 Girl vs. Boy (2012–2014), TV2

Norway
 Rektors kontor (2020), NRK Super
 Verst når det gjelder (2021), NRK Super

Pakistan
 Bulbulay (2009–2017), ARY Digital
 Rubber Band (2005–2007), ARY Digital

Philippines
 Boys Nxt Door (2007–2008), GMA Network
 Gokada Go! (2007), ABS-CBN
 Iskul Bukol (1977–1990), IBC-13
 Let's Go (2006–2007), ABS-CBN
 Luv U (2012–2016), ABS-CBN
 Rakista (2008), TV5

South Korea
 Feel It, Genie (2018–2019), Olleh TV, YouTube, Facebook
 Nonstop (2000–2007), MBC
What Happens to My Family? (2014–2015), KBS2

Spain
 Cambio de clase (2006–2009), Disney Channel Spain
 Campamento Newton (2022–present), Disney Channel Spain
  (1994–1995), Telemadrid
  (1997–1999), Telecinco
 Mónica Chef (2017), Clan

United Kingdom

 As the Bell Rings (2007–2008), Disney Channel UK
 All at Sea (2013–2015), CBBC
 Atlantis High (2001–2002), Channel 5
 Bad Education (2012–2014), BBC Three
 Belfry Witches (1999–2000), BBC One
 Big Boys (2022–present), Channel 4
 Billy Bunter of Greyfriars School (1952–1961), BBC
 Bromwell High (2005), Channel 4
 A Bunch of Fives (1977–1978), ITV
 Cavegirl (2002–2003), BBC One, CBBC
 Coming of Age (2007–2011), BBC Three
 The Crust (2004–2005), CBBC
 Dani's House (2008–2012), CBBC
 Dani's Castle (2013–2015), CBBC
 Derry Girls (2018–2022), Channel 4
 Fresh Meat (2011–2016), Channel 4
 Harry and Cosh (1999–2003), Channel 5
 Help! I'm a Teenage Outlaw (2004), CITV
 Hollywood 7 (2001), CBBC
 Hotel Trubble (2008–2011), CBBC
 I Dream (2004), CBBC
 The Inbetweeners (2008–2011), E4
 Jinx (2009–2010), CBBC
 Kerching! (2003–2006), CBBC
 L.A. 7 (2000), CBBC
 The Legend of Dick and Dom (2009–2011), CBBC
 Miami 7 (1999), CBBC
 Microsoap (1998–2000), CBBC
 Millie Inbetween (2014–2018), CBBC
 Mike and Angelo (1989–2000), CITV
 My Almost Famous Family (2009), CBBC
 My Life as a Popat (2004–2007), ITV, CITV
 My Parents Are Aliens (1999–2006), ITV, CITV
 My Phone Genie (2012), CITV
 No Sweat (1997–1998), CBBC
 Nova Jones (2021–present), CBBC
 Off the Hook (2009), BBC Three
 Pixelface (2011–2012), CBBC
 Pramface (2012–2014), BBC Three
 PRU (2022–present), BBC Three
 Raised by Wolves (2013–2016), Channel 4
 Renford Rejects (1998–2001), Nickelodeon UK
 Roy (2009–2015), CBBC
 Sadie J (2011–2013), CBBC
 So Awkward (2015–2021), CBBC
 Some Girls (2012–2014), BBC Three
 Spatz (1990–1992), CITV
 Starstreet (2001–2002), CITV
 Still So Awkward (2021), CBBC
 Summer in Transylvania (2010–2011), Nickelodeon UK
 Teenage Health Freak (1991–1993), Channel 4
 Viva S Club (2002), CBBC
 Weirdsister College (2001), ITV
 The Wild House (1997–1999), CBBC
 Young Dracula (2006–2014), CBBC
 Young, Gifted and Broke (1989), ITV
 The Young Ones (1982–1984), BBC Two

United States

 10 Things I Hate About You (2009–2010), ABC Family
 100 Deeds for Eddie McDowd (1999–2002), Nickelodeon
 100 Things to Do Before High School (2014–2016), Nickelodeon
 A.N.T. Farm (2011–2014), Disney Channel
 The Adventures of Pete and Pete (1993–1996), Nickelodeon
 Alexa & Katie (2018–2020), Netflix
 Alien Dawn (2013–2014), Nickelodeon, TeenNick
 Aliens in America (2007–2008), The CW
 All About Us (2001), NBC
 All Grown Up! (2003–2008), Nickelodeon
 All Night (2018), Hulu
 American Vandal (2017–2018), Netflix
 Andi Mack (2017–2019), Disney Channel
 As the Bell Rings (2007–2009), Disney Channel
 The Astronauts (2020–2021), Nickelodeon
 Austin & Ally (2011–2016), Disney Channel
 Awkward (2011–2016), MTV
 Bella and the Bulldogs (2015–2016), Nickelodeon
 Best Friends Whenever (2015–2016), Disney Channel
 Best.Worst.Weekend.Ever. (2018), Netflix
 Big Mouth (2017–present), Netflix
 Big Time Rush (2009–2013), Nickelodeon
 Bizaardvark (2016–2019), Disney Channel
 Blossom (1990–1995), NBC
 Blue Mountain State (2010–2011), Spike TV
 Boo, Bitch (2022), Netflix
 Boy Meets World (1993–2000), ABC
 The Brothers Garcia (2000–2004), Nickelodeon
 Brothers and Sisters (1979), NBC
 Brutally Normal (2000), The WB
 Bucket & Skinner's Epic Adventures (2011–2013), Nickelodeon, TeenNick
 Bunk'd (2015–present), Disney Channel
 Cake (2006), CBS
 California Dreams (1992–1996), NBC
 Chad (2021–present), TBS
 Crash & Bernstein (2012–2014), Disney XD
 City Guys (1997–2001), NBC
 Clarissa Explains It All (1991–1994), Nickelodeon
 Clueless (1996–1999), ABC, UPN
 Co-Ed Fever (1979), CBS
 Coop & Cami Ask the World (2018–2020), Disney Channel
 Cory in the House (2007–2008), Disney Channel
 Cousin Skeeter (1998–2001), Nickelodeon
 Daria (1997–2002), MTV
 Dead End: Paranormal Park (2022), Netflix
 Delta House (1979), ABC
 Diary of a Future President (2020–2021), Disney+
 A Different World (1987–1993), NBC
 Do Over (2002), The WB
 Dog with a Blog (2012–2015), Disney Channel
 Danger Force (2020–present), Nickelodeon
 Drake & Josh (2004–2007), Nickelodeon
 Drama Club (2021), Nickelodeon
 Duncanville (2020–2022), Fox
 Even Stevens (2000–2003), Disney Channel
 Every Witch Way (2014–2015), Nickelodeon
 Everybody Hates Chris (2005–2009), UPN, The CW
 Everything's Gonna Be Okay (2020–2021), Freeform
 The Expanding Universe of Ashley Garcia (2020), Netflix
 The Facts of Life (1979–1988), NBC
 Fairfax (2021–present)
 Faking It (2014–2016), MTV
 Fast Layne (2019), Disney Channel
 Fast Times (1986), CBS
 Ferris Bueller (1990), NBC
 Filthy Preppy Teen$ (2016), Fullscreen
 Fred: The Show (2012), Nickelodeon
 Free for All (2003), Showtime
 The Fresh Prince of Bel-Air (1990–1996), NBC
 Gabby Duran & the Unsittables (2019–2021), Disney Channel
 Gamer's Guide to Pretty Much Everything (2015–2017), Disney XD
 Game Shakers (2015–2019), Nickelodeon
 Gidget (1965–1966), ABC
 Gilmore Girls (2000–2007), The CW
 Girl Meets World (2014–2017), Disney Channel
 Go Fish (2001), NBC
 Good Luck Charlie (2010–2014), Disney Channel
 Good Morning, Miss Bliss (1988–1989), Disney Channel
 Good Vibes (2011), MTV
 Gordita Chronicles (2022), HBO Max
 Gortimer Gibbon's Life on Normal Street (2014–2016), Amazon Prime Video
 Grachi (2011–2013), Nickelodeon Latin America
 Great Scott! (1992), Fox
 Grosse Pointe (2000–2001), The WB
 Grown-ish (2018–present), Freeform
 Hang Time (1995–2000), NBC
 Hannah Montana (2006–2011), Disney Channel
 Happy Days (1974–1984), ABC
 Happyland (2014), MTV
 The Hard Times of RJ Berger (2010–2011), MTV
 The Haunted Hathaways (2013–2015), Nickelodeon
 Head of the Class (1986–1991), ABC
 Head of the Class (2021), HBO Max
 Henry Danger (2014–2020), Nickelodeon
 Hey Dude (1989–1991), Nickelodeon
 High School USA! (2013), Fox
 How to Rock (2012), Nickelodeon
 Hunter Street (2017–2021), Nickelodeon, TeenNick
 I Didn't Do It (2014–2015), Disney Channel
 I'm in the Band (2009–2011), Disney XD
 iCarly (2007–2012), Nickelodeon
 The Inbetweeners (2012), MTV
 The Jersey (1999–2004), Disney Channel
 Jessie (2011–2015), Disney Channel
 Jonas (2009–2010), Disney Channel
 The Journey of Allen Strange (1997–2000), Nickelodeon
 Just Jordan (2007–2008), Nickelodeon
 Karen (1964–1965), NBC
 K.C. Undercover (2015–2018), Disney Channel
 Kickin' It (2011–2015), Disney XD
 Kenan & Kel (1996–2000), Nickelodeon
 The Kicks (2015–2016), Amazon Prime Video
 The Kids From C.A.P.E.R. (1976–1977), NBC
 Knight Squad (2018–2019), Nickelodeon
 Lab Rats (2012–2015), Disney XD
 Lab Rats: Elite Force (2016), Disney XD
 Legends of Chamberlain Heights (2016–2017), Comedy Central
 Level Up (2012–2013), Cartoon Network
 Little Demon (2022–present), Comedy Central
 Liv and Maddie (2013–2017), Disney Channel
 Lizzie McGuire (2001–2004), Disney Channel
 Lugar Heights (2001–2008), mun2, MTV Tres
 Malcolm in the Middle (2000–2006), Fox
 Malibu, CA (1998–2000), syndication
 Malibu Rescue (2019–2020), Netflix
 The Many Loves of Dobie Gillis (1959–1963), CBS
 Margie (1961–1962), ABC
 Marvin Marvin (2012–2013), Nickelodeon
 Max & Shred (2014–2016), Nickelodeon
 Maybe It's Me (2001–2002), The WB
 Meet Corliss Archer (1951), CBS
 Mighty Med (2013–2015), Disney XD
 Moesha (1996–2001), UPN
 Mr. Student Body President (2016–2018), go90
 My Brother and Me (1994–1995), Nickelodeon
 My Wife and Kids (2001–2005), ABC
 The Naked Brothers Band (2007–2009), Nickelodeon
 Napoleon Dynamite (2012), Fox
 Ned's Declassified School Survival Guide (2004–2007), Nickelodeon 
 The New Adventures of Beans Baxter (1987–1988), Fox
 No Good Nick (2019), Netflix
 Noah Knows Best (2000), Nickelodeon
 O'Grady (2004–2006), The N
 Odd Man Out (1999–2000), ABC
 One World (1998–2001), NBC
 The Other Kingdom (2016), Nickelodeon
 Out of the Blue (1995–1996), syndication
 Out of Jimmy's Head (2007–2008), Cartoon Network
 Out of This World (1987–1991), syndication
 Pair of Kings (2010–2013), Disney XD
 Parker Lewis Can't Lose (1990–1993), Fox
 Partners in Rhyme (2021–present), ALLBLK
 Pepper Ann (1997–2000), ABC, UPN
 Phil of the Future (2004–2006), Disney Channel
 Prince of Peoria (2018–2019), Netflix
 Project Mc2 (2015–2017), Netflix
 Raven's Home (2017–present), Disney Channel
 Resident Advisors (2015), Hulu
 Richie Rich (2015), Netflix
 Romeo! (2003–2006), Nickelodeon
 Running the Halls (1993), NBC
 Sabrina the Teenage Witch (1996–2003), ABC, The WB
 Salute Your Shorts (1991–1992), Nickelodeon
 Sam & Cat (2013–2014), Nickelodeon
 Saved by the Bell (1989–1993), NBC
 Saved by the Bell (2020–2021), Peacock
 Saved by the Bell: The College Years (1993–1994), NBC
 Saved by the Bell: The New Class (1993–2000), NBC
 School of Rock (2016–2018), Nickelodeon
 Scout's Safari (2002–2004), Discovery Kids
 Shake It Up (2010–2013), Disney Channel
 Sister, Sister (1994–1999), ABC, The WB
 So Little Time (2001–2002), Fox Family, ABC Family
 Sonny with a Chance (2009–2011), Disney Channel
 Spencer (1984–1985), NBC
 Square Pegs (1982–1983), CBS
 Star Falls (2018), Nickelodeon, TeenNick
 Stuck in the Middle (2016–2018), Disney Channel
 Suburgatory (2011–2014), ABC
 The Suite Life of Zack & Cody (2005–2008), Disney Channel
 The Suite Life on Deck (2008–2011), Disney Channel
 Supah Ninjas (2011–2013), Nickelodeon
 Sydney to the Max (2019–2021), Disney Channel 
 Taina (2001–2002), Nickelodeon
 Talia in the Kitchen (2015), Nickelodeon
 Team Kaylie (2019–2020), Netflix
 Teen Angel (1997–1998), ABC
 That '70s Show (1998–2006), Fox
 That '90s Show (2023–present), Netflix
 That's So Raven (2003–2007), Disney Channel
 The Thundermans (2013–2018) Nickelodeon
 The Troop (2009–2013), Nickelodeon, TeenNick
 True Jackson, VP (2008–2011), Nickelodeon
 Tucker (2000–2001), NBC
 Ultra Violet & Black Scorpion (2022), Disney Channel
 Undeclared (2001–2002), Fox
 Undergrads (2001), MTV
 Unfabulous (2004–2007), Nickelodeon
 Unsupervised (2012), FX
 USA High (1997–1999), USA
 Velma (2023–present), HBO Max
 Victorious (2010–2013), Nickelodeon
 The Villains of Valley View (2022–present), Disney Channel
 The Wannabes (2009–2011), Starz Kids & Family
 Warped! (2022), Nickelodeon
 Weird Science (1994–1998), USA
 Welcome Back, Kotter (1975–1979), ABC
 Welcome Freshmen (1991–1993), Nickelodeon
 Wet Hot American Summer: First Day of Camp (2015), Netflix
 What I Like About You (2002–2006), The WB
 What's Happening!! (1976–1979), ABC
 WITS Academy (2015), Nickelodeon
 Wizards of Waverly Place (2007–2012), Disney Channel
 The Wonder Years (1988–1993), ABC
 The Wonder Years (2021–present), ABC
 Young Rock (2021–present), NBC
 Zach Stone Is Gonna Be Famous (2013), MTV
 Zeke and Luther (2009–2012), Disney XD
 Zoe, Duncan, Jack and Jane (1999–2000), The WB
 Zoey 101 (2005–2008), Nickelodeon

Venezuela
 Isa TKM (2008–2010), Nickelodeon Latin America
 NPS: No puede ser (2011), Venevisión, Boomerang

Other countries
 Belgium – Buiten De Zone (1994–1996), VRT
 Ireland – The Young Offenders (2018–2020), RTÉ2, BBC Three
 Netherlands – Hunter Street (2017–present), Nickelodeon, TeenNick, Nickelodeon UK
 Portugal – Floribella (2006–2008), SIC
 Russia – As the Bell Rings (2010–2012), Disney Channel Russia
 Singapore – As the Bell Rings (2007), Disney Channel Asia
 Taiwan – As the Bell Rings (2012–2013), Disney Channel Asia
 Turkey – Zil Çalınca (2012–2013), Disney Channel Turkey
 Ukraine –  (2018),

See also
 Teen sitcom
 Teen drama — (List of teen dramas)
 Teen films — (List of teen films)
 Teen pop
 Teen magazine — (List of teen magazines)

References

Sitcoms
 
Works about adolescence
Lists of television series by genre
Adolescence-related lists